Tabeer may refer to:

 Tabeer (album), a 2008 album by Shafqat Amanat Ali
 Tabeer (TV series), a 2018 Pakistani drama series